Sidsel Bauck (1929 in Oslo – 2005) was a Norwegian trade unionist and politician.

She started working for the union Union of Employees in Commerce and Offices in 1962, then became elected deputy leader in 1980. From 1988 to 1994 she was the president of the union.

References

1929 births
2005 deaths
Trade unionists from Oslo
Politicians from Oslo
Norwegian Association for Women's Rights people